Jonathan O'Rourke (born 21 April 1994) is a former professional Australian rules footballer who played for the Greater Western Sydney Giants and the Hawthorn Football Club in the Australian Football League.

Junior career
O'Rourke was known as an inside midfielder with a hunger for contested football with good speed and endurance. A member of the Calder Cannons, O'Rourke was awarded 2012 All Australian honours following the NAB AFL Under-18 Championships.

AFL career

Greater Western Sydney
O'Rourke was recruited by the  club in the 2012 national draft, with pick 2. His rookie year was blighted by injuries with hamstring problems and a broken jaw. O'Rourke made his debut in round 16, 2013, against  at the Sydney Cricket Ground. O'Rourke spent the early part of the 2014 season playing for the Giants in the North East Australian Football League (NEAFL). When he managed to break into the Giant's AFL team he strung together seven successive games before again injuring his hamstring to miss the last game of the season.

Hawthorn
At the end of the 2014 season, he requested a trade back to Melbourne. He nominated  as his club of choice and he was officially traded to Hawthorn in October.

O'Rourke spent most of the 2015 season developing in the VFL, he didn't miss a game all season which was a change from being injury ridden at the Giants.

O'Rourke's time since 2015 has been frustrated with a series of hamstring rated injuries.
He missed the majority of 2017 with hamstring related injuries, injuring himself a week before the season then later on mid year.

O'Rourke was delisted at the end of the 2018 season. He signed to play with the Northern Blues in the Victorian Football League in 2019.

Personal life
Growing up, O'Rourke supported the Richmond Football Club. He cites Roger Federer and Chris Judd as being among his sporting heroes.

Statistics

|- style=background:#EAEAEA
| 2013 ||  || 24
| 1 || 0 || 0 || 5 || 2 || 7 || 2 || 3 || 0.0 || 0.0 || 5.0 || 2.0 || 7.0 || 2.0 || 3.0 || 0
|-
| 2014 ||  || 24
| 8 || 0 || 0 || 37 || 57 || 94 || 22 || 11 || 0.0 || 0.0 || 4.6 || 7.1 || 11.8 || 2.8 || 1.4 || 0
|- style=background:#EAEAEA
| 2015 ||  || 13
| 2 || 1 || 0 || 14 || 20 || 34 || 8 || 3 || 0.5 || 0.0 || 7.0 || 10.0 || 17.0 || 4.0 || 1.5 || 0
|-
| 2016 ||  || 13
| 7 || 3 || 1 || 49 || 54 || 103 || 16 || 19 || 0.4 || 0.1 || 7.0 || 7.7 || 14.7 || 2.3 || 2.7 || 0
|- style=background:#EAEAEA
| 2017 ||  || 13
| 0 || — || — || — || — || — || — || — || — || — || — || — || — || — || — || 0
|-
| 2018 ||  || 13
| 3 || 0 || 0 || 20 || 32 || 52 || 11 || 6 || 0.0 || 0.0 || 6.7 || 10.7 || 17.3 || 3.7 || 2.0 || 0
|- class="sortbottom"
! colspan=3| Career
! 21 !! 4 !! 1 !! 125 !! 165 !! 290 !! 59 !! 42 !! 0.2 !! 0.0 !! 6.0 !! 7.9 !! 13.8 !! 2.8 !! 2.0 !! 0
|}

Honours and achievements
Team
 VFL premiership player: 2018
 Minor premiership: 2015

Individual
 Under 18 All-Australian team: 2012

References

External links

1994 births
Living people
Greater Western Sydney Giants players
Hawthorn Football Club players
Australian rules footballers from Tasmania
Calder Cannons players
Box Hill Football Club players
Preston Football Club (VFA) players